Mezdra Point (‘Nos Mezdra’ \'nos 'mez-dra\) is the ice-free northeast entrance point of Brauro Cove on the northwest coast of Snow Island in the South Shetland Islands, Antarctica. It is situated 1.41 km southwest of Cape Timblón, and 1.91 km northeast of Irnik Point.

The point is named after the town of Mezdra in northwestern Bulgaria.

Location
British mapping in 1968, Bulgarian in 2009.

Map
 L.L. Ivanov. Antarctica: Livingston Island and Greenwich, Robert, Snow and Smith Islands. Scale 1:120000 topographic map.  Troyan: Manfred Wörner Foundation, 2009.

References
 Mezdra Point. SCAR Composite Gazetteer of Antarctica.
 Bulgarian Antarctic Gazetteer. Antarctic Place-names Commission. (details in Bulgarian, basic data in English)

External links
 Mezdra Point. Copernix satellite image

Headlands of the South Shetland Islands
Bulgaria and the Antarctic
Mezdra